State Highway 93 (SH 93) is a New Zealand State Highway connecting the Southland township of Mataura with the Western Otago town of Clinton. This provides a slightly quicker route between the cities of Dunedin and Invercargill, as it bypasses the town of Gore. It is roughly 43.2 km long.

History
The highway was gazetted in 2001.

Route
SH 93 departs from SH 1 as Old Coach Roads and ascends out of Clinton before twisting through a small gorge before veering west and driving through undulating farmland before descending into Mataura. The road passes the old paper mill before turning right and crossing the Mataura River to meet SH 1 near the town centre.

See also
List of New Zealand state highways

References

External links
 New Zealand Transport Agency

93